The 4. Internationales ADAC 1000 Kilometer Rennen Nürburgring took place on 1 June, on the Nürburgring Nordschleife, (West Germany).  It was also the fourth round of the F.I.A. World Sports Car Championship, which was running to new regulations introduced at the beginning of the season.

Report

Entry

A massive total of 72 racing cars were registered for this event, of which 69 arrived for practice. Only these, only 54 started the long distance race on the 14.174 mile German circuit. The first three events of the season, ended with victory for Scuderia Ferrari. As Hill and Collins also won the last race of the previous season, the Venezuelan Grand Prix Ferrari had now won four races in a row. With these new rules, and Maserati on the brink of financial crisis, Scuderia Ferrari would head the Italian challenge. Ferrari had four works 250 TR 58s in the Eifel mountains, Mike Hawthorn/Peter Collins, Luigi Musso/Phil Hill, Wolfgang von Trips/Olivier Gendebien and Gino Munaron/Wolfgang Seidel. Opposition would no longer come from Maserati… but from Porsche and Aston Martin.

David Brown won the event in 1957 sent along three  Aston Martin DBR1 over from England for Stirling Moss/Jack Brabham, Tony Brooks/Stuart Lewis-Evans and Roy Salvadori/Carroll Shelby, while Porsche arrived with two different cars; 550 RS and 718 RSK for their squad of drivers led by Jean Behra and Harry Schell. They were joined a fleet of privateer drivers in their Alfa Romeos, Oscas and other mainline sportscars.

Qualifying

Qualifying was held over three sessions for a total of 1,710 minutes over the three days prior to the race. The Ferrari 250 TR of Hawthorn took pole position, averaging a speed of 87.484 mph around the 14.173 mile circuit.

Race

 
With each lap over 14 miles in length, the race covered a total of 44 laps, or 1,000 kilometres, the Nordschleife was a fearsome thing to behold. The day of the race would be warm and dry, with a crowd of approximately 150,000 in attendance to witness the race.

As for the race victory, this did not go to Scuderia Ferrari, as they were beaten by more than three minutes by the Aston Martin DBR1/300 of Moss and Brabham, gaining the marque their first points of the season and Ferrari's first defeat of the season. The winning partnership, won in a time of 7hr 23:32.0 mins., averaging a speed of 84.360 mph. The margin of triumph over the Ferrari of Hawthorn/Collins was 3 min 44s, who were followed home by their teammates von Trips/Gendebien who were a further 5 min 58s adrift. The works Ferraris took the next two places, meaning they finished 2-3-4-5. Ferrari's second place clinched that year's World Sports Car Championship as with 30 points no other manufacturer could catch them. Stirling Moss's pace was so quick that his fastest lap of the race, was faster than Hawthorn's pole lap. The race continued for another hour to allow the other classes/division to try and complete the full 1000 km. Sadly, Erwin Bauer after being shown the checkered flag, as he did not see it, he continued racing and crashed fatally on what was supposed to be his slowing down lap.

Official Classification

Class Winners are in Bold text.

 Fastest Lap: Stirling Moss, 9:43.0secs (87.521 mph)

Class Winners

Standings after the race

Note: Only the top five positions are included in this set of standings.Championship points were awarded for the first six places in each race in the order of 8-6-4-3-2-1, excepting the RAC Tourist Trophy, for which points were awarded on a 4-3-2-1 for the first four places. Manufacturers were only awarded points for their highest finishing car with no points awarded for positions filled by additional cars. Only the best 4 results out of the 6 races could be retained by each manufacturer. Points earned but not counted towards the championship totals are listed within brackets in the above table.

References

Nurburgring
6 Hours of Nürburgring
Nurburgring